Aarhus Symposium is an annual leadership conference taking place at the University of Aarhus, Denmark, on the first Friday in November. The aim of the event is to connect leaders of today with leaders of tomorrow. To do so, a wide range of key decision-makers are invited to share their experiences and engage in discussions with students from various universities. Hereby, the symposium allows students to relate their academic insights to the broader business society.

Aarhus Symposium was founded in 2011 and has since expanded its concept to also involve Aarhus Symposium Focus, and Aarhus Symposium Challenge.

Aarhus Symposium is a non-profit organisation, and all symposia are organised by voluntary students together with a pro bono board of directors.

History 
Four students at Aarhus University established Aarhus Symposium in 2011: David Scherer, Jens Riis Andersen, Kasper Vinther Olesen, and Andreas Emmertsen. They gathered support from other students to organise the very first Aarhus Symposium with the objective of building a bridge between students, i.e. the future leaders, and leaders in today's businesses and society.

The first annual Aarhus Symposium welcomed renowned speakers from the business society such as Carsten Bjerg (then CEO of Grundfos), Lars Rohde (then CEO of ATP), and Maria Rønn (CEO of Danmarks Radio). Throughout the years, the programme has extended to include prominent speakers such as His Royal Highness The Crown Prince of Denmark, Lars Rebien Sørensen (president and CEO of Novo Nordisk), and the Danish Prime Minister Lars Løkke Rasmussen.

Aarhus Symposium has grown through the years as a result of wide support from students, speakers, partners, and others. In 2012, the Organising Committee introduced Battle of the Economists; an event to take place on Monday in the week of Aarhus Symposium. It provided a national focus to the overall theme of Aarhus Symposium. The event was renamed Aarhus Symposium Focus in 2016 to broaden the possibilities for topics that exceed economic issues.

In 2013, Aarhus Symposium Challenge was established to strengthen the connection between students and the leaders of today. Aarhus Symposium Challenge is an essay competition in which selected speakers put forth a challenge for students to solve. Through their essay, students obtain a seat at both Aarhus Symposium and Aarhus Symposium Focus, and they potentially qualify for Leaders’ Forum. Since its initiation in 2013, an increasing number of students have participated in Aarhus Symposium Challenge, making it the primary sign-up for Aarhus Symposium and Aarhus Symposium Focus.

Aarhus Symposium 

Aarhus Symposium takes place on the first Friday in November. Here, business executives and key decision-makers are invited to share their experiences and insights regarding a specific theme. They do so with different perspectives that reflect the tracks, i.e. subtopics, of the event.

Past symposia

Aarhus Symposium Focus 
Formerly known as Battle of the Economists

Aarhus Symposium Focus is an annual conference which takes place on Monday in the week of Aarhus Symposium. Here, experts with various backgrounds are invited to share their thoughts on a topic related to the overall theme of Aarhus Symposium. The event provides a national focus as the topic strives to reflect one of Denmark's most critical challenges.

Aarhus Symposium Challenge 
Aarhus Symposium Challenge is an essay competition where selected speakers put forth a challenge for students to solve. By submitting a qualified essay, students obtain a seat at both Aarhus Symposium and Aarhus Symposium Focus. Additionally, the participating students compete for the Aarhus Symposium Award and a spot in Leaders’ Forum.

Leaders' Forum 

Leaders’ Forum is an exclusive and intimate session where selected students discuss their essay contribution with the leader that put forth the respective challenge. Only the best essay contributions under each challenge topic qualifies for this informal session.

Throughout the years, Leaders’ Forum has attracted much attention from the media inasmuch as it is unique in a Danish context and provides both the attending students and the top leaders the opportunity to learn from each other.

The Aarhus Symposium Award 

The most extraordinary essay contribution in Aarhus Symposium Challenge will be rewarded the Aarhus Symposium Award on stage at the very end of Aarhus Symposium. Prior winners of the Aarhus Symposium Award are:
2013: Bastian Stemann Lau
2014: Moma Vujisic
2015: Oskar Harmsen
2016: Luke McGinty
2017: Bastian Emil Jørgensen
2018: Soraya Redondo Mezmizi
2019: Morten Thinggaard Pedersen
2021: Christian Nyegaard Lambertsen
2022: Lasse Daabeck

Other events 
Besides facilitating Aarhus Symposium and Aarhus Symposium Focus, Aarhus Symposium also hosts a variety of other events that takes places at Aarhus University. Most notable are Aarhus Symposium Theme Announcement and Aarhus Symposium Challenge Launch; both of which are closely linked to the three key elements of Aarhus Symposium.

Organising Committee 
The Organising Committee of Aarhus Symposium consists of approximately 41 voluntary students, who have the responsibility for planning, funding, promoting, and executing all events. The Organising Committee is divided into smaller groups with specific focus areas:
Steering Committee
Programme Group
Business Relations Group
Marketing Group
Essentials Group
University Alliances
IT Group
Finance Group
Business Development

External links 

Aarhus Symposium
Aarhus Symposium Focus
Aarhus Symposium Challenge

References 

Annual events in Denmark
Conferences
Aarhus University
Student events
Academic conferences
Organizations based in Aarhus
Student organizations in Denmark
Non-profit organizations based in Denmark
Business conferences
Autumn events in Denmark